Budruk is a suffix found in the place names of the former Maratha territory in India. It is similar to Kalan found in northern India, and is used to distinguish two segments of a village or two villages with the same name. "Khurd" means smaller, and "Burdruk" means greater; both the words are of Persian origin.

Villages with the designation Budruk include:

Bavdhan Budruk, a suburb in west of Pune in the Indian state of Maharashtra
Ghoti Budruk, census town in Nashik district in the Indian state of Maharashtra (cf. Ghoti Khurd)
Kusgaon Budruk, census town in Pune district in the Indian state of Maharashtra
Nimbhore Budruk, census town in Jalgaon district in the Indian state of Maharashtra
Pimpode Budruk, one of the largest villages in Koregaon tehsil in the Satara District of Maharashtra state of India
Ugar Budruk, village in the southern state of Karnataka, India (cf. Ugar Khurd)
Vadhu Budruk, the place in Shirur Tehsil of the Pune district
Kondhwa Budruk, the place in Pisoli of Pune District

References 

Place name element etymologies
Geography of India
Suffixes